Karol Joseph "Bo" Bobko (born December 23, 1937), (Col, USAF, Ret.), is an American aerospace engineer, retired U.S. Air Force officer, test pilot, and  a former USAF and NASA astronaut.  Bobko was the first graduate of the US Air Force Academy to travel in space.

Early life 
Bobko was born on December 23, 1937, in Queens, New York, to a family with Ukrainian and Lithuanian roots. He graduated from Brooklyn Technical High School, New York, in 1955, then received a Bachelor of Science degree from the United States Air Force Academy in 1959, and a Master of Science degree in Aerospace Engineering from the University of Southern California in 1970.

Military service 
Bobko was a member of the first graduating class of the U.S. Air Force Academy. Subsequent to receiving his commission and navigator rating, he attended pilot training at Bartow Air Base, Florida, and Vance Air Force Base, Oklahoma. He completed his flight training and received his pilot wings in 1960.

From 1961 to 1965, he flew F-100 and F-105 aircraft while assigned as a pilot with the 523d Tactical Fighter Squadron at Cannon Air Force Base, New Mexico, and the 336th Tactical Fighter Squadron at Seymour Johnson Air Force Base, North Carolina. He attended the Aerospace Research Pilot School at Edwards Air Force Base, California, and was assigned as an astronaut to the USAF Manned Orbiting Laboratory (MOL) program in 1966.

He has logged over 6,600 hours flight time in the F-100, F-104, F-105, T-33, T-38, and other aircraft.

NASA career 
Bobko became part of NASA Astronaut Group 7 in September 1969 after the cancellation of the Manned Orbiting Laboratory (MOL) program. He was a crewmember on the highly successful Skylab Medical Experiment Altitude Test (SMEAT) -- a 56-day ground simulation of the Skylab mission, enabling crewmen to collect medical experiments baseline data and evaluate equipment, operations and procedures.

Bobko was a member of the astronaut support crew for the Apollo–Soyuz Test Project (ASTP). This historic first international manned space flight was completed in July 1975. Subsequently, he was a member of the support crew for the Space Shuttle Approach and Landing Tests conducted at Edwards Air Force Base. He served alternately as CAPCOM and prime chase pilot during these Approach and Landing Test (ALT) flights.

In preparation for the first flight of Columbia (STS-1) Bobko served as the lead astronaut in the test and checkout group at Kennedy Space Center.

A veteran of three space flights, Bobko logged a total of 386 hours in space. He was the pilot on STS-6 (April 4–9, 1983); and was the mission commander on STS-51-D (April 12–19, 1985) and STS-51-J (October 3–7, 1985).

Spaceflight experience 

Bobko was pilot for STS-6, which launched from Kennedy Space Center in Florida, on April 4, 1983. During the maiden voyage of Challenger, the crew deployed a large communications satellite (TDRS-1) and the rocket stage (Inertial Upper Stage) required to boost it to geosynchronous orbit. The STS-6 crew also conducted the first Shuttle spacewalk (EVA) and additionally conducted numerous other experiments in materials processing and the recording of lightning activities from space. There were also three Getaway Specials activated on the flight. After 120 hours of orbital operations, Challenger landed on the concrete runway at Edwards Air Force Base in California, on April 9, 1983.

On his second mission, Bobko was the commander of STS-51-D which launched from Kennedy Space Center on April 12, 1985. The mission was to deploy two communications satellites, perform electrophoresis and echocardiograph operations in space, in addition to accomplishing other experiments. When one of the communications satellites malfunctioned, the first unscheduled spacewalk was made to activate the satellite which required rendezvous and operations with the remote manipulator arm. After 168 hours of orbital operations, Discovery landed on Runway 33 at Kennedy Space Center on April 19, 1985.

Bobko's final flight was as commander of STS-51-J, the second Space Shuttle Department of Defense mission, which launched from Kennedy Space Center on October 3, 1985. This mission carried classified payloads for the Department of Defense and was the second time that a Shuttle mission was used solely for Department of Defense activities. This was the maiden voyage of Atlantis. After 98 hours of orbital operations, Atlantis landed on Edwards Air Force Base Lakebed Runway 23 on October 7, 1985. Bobko became the first person to fly on three different Space Shuttles.

Post-NASA career 
In 1988, Bobko retired from NASA and the Air Force to join the firm of Booz Allen Hamilton, in Houston, Texas. At Booz Allen he was a principal and managed efforts dealing with human space flight. His areas of emphasis were: high performance training simulation, hardware and software systems engineering, spacecraft checkout and testing, space station development and program integration.

In 2000, Bobko joined SPACEHAB, Inc. in Houston, Texas, where he was Vice President for Strategic Programs. He led an organization which develops concepts, processes and hardware for future spaceflight applications. In 2005, Bobko joined Science Applications International Corporation (SAIC) as Program Manager for the NASA Ames Research Center Simulation Laboratories (SimLabs) contract.

Personal life 
He is married to F. Dianne Welsh and has a daughter and a son. He resides with his wife in Half Moon Bay, California.

Awards and honors
Defense Superior Service Medal
Legion of Merit
Distinguished Flying Cross
Defense Meritorious Service Medal
Meritorious Service Medals (2; 1970 and 1979)
NASA Exceptional Service Medals (2)
NASA Space Flight Medals (3)
Johnson Space Center Group Achievement Awards (6)
Air Force Academy Jabara Award (1983)
Cradle of Aviation Museum Long Island Air & Space Hall of Fame
U.S. Astronaut Hall of Fame (May 7, 2011).

References

External links

Astronautix biography of Karol J. Bobko

1937 births
Living people
1983 in spaceflight
1985 in spaceflight
Military personnel from New York City
Aviators from New York (state)
United States Air Force astronauts
United States Astronaut Hall of Fame inductees
American aerospace engineers
People from Queens, New York
Businesspeople from Houston
American people of Polish descent
American people of Lithuanian descent
United States Air Force Academy alumni
U.S. Air Force Test Pilot School alumni
USC Viterbi School of Engineering alumni
United States Air Force officers
American test pilots
NASA people
Booz Allen Hamilton people
Recipients of the Legion of Merit
Recipients of the Distinguished Flying Cross (United States)
Recipients of the Defense Superior Service Medal
Recipients of the NASA Exceptional Service Medal
Recipients of the Jabara Award
Brooklyn Technical High School alumni
Engineers from New York City
Space Shuttle program astronauts
Recipients of the Meritorious Service Medal (United States)